The Ensinger Group is engaged in the development and manufacture of compounds, semi-finished products, technical parts, composite materials and profiles made of engineering and high-performance plastics. The family-owned enterprise is represented in major industrial regions with manufacturing facilities or sales offices. The main office is located in Nufringen/Baden-Württemberg, Germany.

History  
The company was founded in 1966 by Wilfried Ensinger. First areas of focus included the manufacture and sale of thermoplastic engineering plastics. Closely linked with this technology, the company worked on further development of the extrusion process and application technology. A short time after relocation of the headquarters to Nufringen, Ensinger launched the production of components manufactured by machining semi-finished products. In 1977, the company dispatched its first volume-produced thermal insulating profiles made of glass fibre-reinforced polyamide 6.6 to manufacturers of aluminium windows. A second plant was erected in 1980 in Cham/Bavaria. After the launch of other product lines, Ensinger founded a number of additional subsidiaries in Europe, North America, South America and Asia. Since 2007 the company has been present in China with its own production facility.

Business field 
The products are used in a wide variety of industrial sectors, including mechanical engineering, in the automotive and aviation industry and in medical technology. The technical solutions based on thermoplastic polymers are also very common in the food industry and in electrical and semiconductor technology. In many cases, high -performance plastics replace other materials such as metals or ceramics. The segment disc distance made of insulating plastic for insulating glass was sold to the Fenzi Group in 2019.

Locations 
The company group employs a total workforce of ca. 2,700 in 33 locations.

Production sites 

 Nufringen, Germany
 Cham, Germany
 Rottenburg-Ergenzingen, Germany
 Seewalchen, Austria
 Otelfingen, Switzerland
 Beynost, France
 Olcella di Busto Garolfo, Italy
 Tonyrefail, Wales, UK
 Bridgwater, UK
 Rossendale, UK
 Washington, Pennsylvania, USA
 Grenloch, New Jersey, USA
 Greenwood, Delaware, USA
 Putnam, Connecticut, USA
 Houston, Texas, USA
 Sao Leopoldo, Rio Grande do Sul, Brazil
 Song Jiang, Shanghai, China
 Johor, Malyasia

The company also owns subsidiaries in Denmark, Poland, Sweden, Spain, Czech Republic, Turkey, Japan, Singapore, Vietnam, India, Taiwan and South Korea.

Business segments 

To process the thermoplastic polymers, Ensinger uses a number of production methods, in particular compounding, extrusion, machining, injection moulding, casting, sintering and compression molding. 

The spectrum of materials used ranges from engineering plastics (such as PA, PET and POM) through to the category of highly temperature-resistant high-performance plastics (such as PEEK, PPS, and PI).

Thermoplastic polymer products are used in different fields, including the automotive and aerospace industries, mechanical engineering, medical technology, the electrical and semiconductor sectors and food industry. 

On 1 February 2022, it was announced Ensinger had concluded a joint agreement to acquire INEOS Styrolution's StyLight thermoplastic composite materials business.

References

External links
 ensingerplastics.com

Engineering companies of Germany
Manufacturing companies of Germany
Privately held companies of Germany
German brands
Medical technology companies of Germany
Plastics companies of Germany

Multinational companies headquartered in Germany